Reset is the debut studio album by American rapper Moneybagg Yo. It was released on November 2, 2018, through Collective Music Group, N-Less Entertainment, Bread Gang Entertainment, and Interscope Records. The production the album was handled by multiple producers including Hitmaka, Tay Keith, Wheezy, Southside, Ben Billions and Rvssian among others. The album also features guest appearances from J. Cole, Future, Kodak Black, YG, Kevin Gates, Rvssian, and Jeremih. 

Reset was preceded by one single, "Okay". The album received mixed reviews from music critics and was a moderate commercial success. It debuted at number 13 on the US Billboard 200 and number eight on the US Top R&B/Hip-Hop Albums charts, earning 31,000 album-equivalent units in its first week.

Promotion

Singles 
"Okay", a collaboration between himself and a fellow American rapper Future, was released as the album's lead single on September 21, 2018. An accompanying music video was released on November 2, 2018, the date of the album's release.

Other songs 
The music video for "Say Na", featuring J. Cole, was released on November 13, 2018. The music video for "Reset" was released on December 24, 2018. The music video for "Lower Level", featuring Kodak Black, was released on February 1, 2019.

Critical reception 

Narsimha Chintaluri of HotNewHipHop called the album "a high-octane spectacle", saying that although it was "a bit long-winded", the album was "well-sequenced for the most part". Chris Gibbons of XXL gave the album a more mixed review, saying that it was a "solid outing", saying that one of his biggest strengths is timing", but said "it would be nice if he were a bit more ambitious", and that "there wasn't much here that separated it from his previous material".

Commercial performance 
Reset debuted at number 13 on the US Billboard 200 and number eight on US Top R&B/Hip-Hop Albums charts, earning 31,000 album-equivalent units (with 5,000 in pure album sales) in its first week. The album also accumulated a total of 33.1 million streams for the album's songs that week.

Track listing 

Notes
  signifies an uncredited co-producer

Charts

References 

2018 debut albums
Moneybagg Yo albums
Collective Music Group albums